Pius Nelson Ikedia (born 11 July 1980) is a Nigerian retired professional footballer  who played as a winger.

Career
While still a teenager, Ikedia scored many goals along with Julius Aghahowa at Nigerian club Bendel Insurance. He played professional football for one year in Ivory Coast before he was discovered by Dutch giants Ajax. After three seasons with Ajax he was loaned out to various Dutch clubs before finally signing a permanent deal with AZ in 2005. In the 2006–07 season he was out on loan to RKC Waalwijk but failed to make an impact and was subsequently released by AZ. He returned to RBC Roosendaal, whom he had been loaned out to while at Ajax, after a trial with the Chicago Fire, after which he would go on to play for Metalurh Donetsk in Ukraine in 2007. Between 2008 and 2010, he once again played for RBC in the Netherlands. After spells in Azerbaijan and Cyprus with AZAL and Mağusa Türk Gücü, respectively, Ikedia returned to the Netherlands to play for amateur side OFC Oostzaan in 2014. He retired in 2016. 

On 20 August 2016, in a match where Ikedia represented Lucky Ajax, a team of former Ajax players, against Sportclub Haarlo, he collapsed and was resuscitated on the pitch. Later, it was announced that he was recovering in the hospital and fine considering the circumstances.

International career
Ikedia has played 15 international matches and scored one goal for Nigeria, for whom he debuted in 1997. He played at the 2002 FIFA World Cup and the 2000 Summer Olympics.

References

External links
Ikedia returns to Holland

1980 births
Living people
Nigerian footballers
ASEC Mimosas players
AFC Ajax players
FC Groningen players
RBC Roosendaal players
AZ Alkmaar players
RKC Waalwijk players
FC Metalurh Donetsk players
AZAL PFK players
Eredivisie players
Eerste Divisie players
Ukrainian Premier League players
Nigeria international footballers
Nigeria under-20 international footballers
Olympic footballers of Nigeria
Footballers at the 2000 Summer Olympics
2002 FIFA World Cup players
2004 African Cup of Nations players
Nigerian expatriate footballers
Expatriate footballers in Ivory Coast
Bendel Insurance F.C. players
Nigerian expatriate sportspeople in Ivory Coast
Expatriate footballers in the Netherlands
Nigerian expatriate sportspeople in the Netherlands
Expatriate footballers in Ukraine
Nigerian expatriate sportspeople in Ukraine
Expatriate footballers in Azerbaijan
Expatriate footballers in Turkey
Association football midfielders
Sportspeople from Lagos
OFC Oostzaan players